David Ewing Duncan is an American journalist, author, researcher and convener with a special emphasis on new discoveries and their implications in the life sciences; he also writes about robots and artificial intelligence. He is the best-selling author of ten books, published in 21 languages. His next book is Talking to Robots: Tales from Our Human-Robot Futures (Dutton-Penguin). He also wrote the bestsellers Experimental Man and Calendar. He lives in San Francisco, California and in Cambridge, Massachusetts.

He is the co-founder and Curator of Arc Fusion, which holds events around the world for leaders and thinkers on the “fusion” of health, IT, and biomedicine, and on the future of humans. Since 2014, Arc Fusion has held over 25 events in 9 cities in Europe and North America on issues ranging from AI and Health and the Future of Humans to the Cost of Healthcare and the Opioid Epidemic. He recently was a Health Strategist-in-Residence for IDEO.

Duncan is a member of the San Francisco Writers' Grotto, a workspace co-operative that also includes Po Bronson, Caroline Paul and Tom Barbash, among others.

Early life
Duncan was born in 1958 in Kansas City, Missouri, and grew up in Lake Quivira, Kansas. His father, Herbert Ewing Duncan, Jr., is an architect. His mother is the artist, photographer and environmental activist Patricia DuBose Duncan. He graduated from Vassar College. From 1981-83 he led The World Bike for Hope, a 14,000-mile, 23-nation bicycle trek around the world that raised money for Project Hope. In 1986-87 he bicycled from Cape Town to Cairo in Africa.

In media
Duncan writes for Wired, Vanity Fair, The New York Times, and Technology Review. He recently wrote a regular column for the Daily Beast.  He is a former Contributing Editor to Wired, Discover, Condé Nast Portfolio and Technology Review; he also has written for The Atlantic, National Geographic, Fortune, Newsweek, Life, Outside, and Harper's, among many others. Duncan was a longtime commentator for NPR’s Morning Edition and was Chief Correspondent on public radio's "Biotech Nation,” part of "Tech Nation,” broadcast weekly out of KQED in San Francisco and heard in 133 countries.

His most recent book is When I'm 164: The new science of radical life extension, and what happens if it succeeds (TED Books). Other books include Masterminds: Genius, DNA and The Quest to Rewrite Life (Harper-Collins) and Residents: The perils and promise of educating young doctors (Scribner). He also wrote the international bestseller Calendar: Humanity's epic struggle to determine a true and accurate year (Avon), a bestseller in 14 countries.

In television, he was a special producer and correspondent for ABC Nightline, and a special producer for ABC’s 20/20. He was a correspondent for NOVA’s Science Now, and a documentary co-producer for the Discovery Channel.

Duncan is a frequent speaker, and appears often in the media, including on the Today Show and NPR's All Things Considered and Morning Edition.

Nonprofit and academia
Duncan was the founding director of the Center for Life Science Policy at the University of California at Berkeley. He is the founder and former director of The BioAgenda Institute for Life Science Policy, a San Francisco-based nonprofit think-tank that held summits, panels and discussions, and sponsored white papers on important issues in the life sciences between 2003 and 2007. In 2011, he launched The Personalized Health Project, sponsored by The Ewing Marion Kauffman Foundation. He has served on a special communications committee at the National Academies of Science and regularly lectures at Singularity University.

Honors
Duncan has won the Magazine Story of the Year Award from the American Association for the Advancement of Science. His articles have twice been cited in nominations for National Magazine Awards, and his work has appeared twice in The Best American Science and Nature Writing. He has won numerous other awards.

Bibliography
Talking to Robots: Tales from our human-robot futures (2019-Dutton-Penguin)
When I'm 164: The new science of radical life extension, and what happens if it succeeds (2012-TED Books)
Life at All Costs (2010-Fiscal Times), a five-part series examining end of life care
Experimental Man: What one man’s body reveals about his future, your health and our toxic world (2009-Wiley)
Masterminds: Genius, DNA and Quest to Rewrite Life (2005-Harper-Collins)
The Calendar: Humanity's Epic Struggle to Determine a True and Accurate Year (1999-Avon)
Residents: The Perils and Promise of Training Young Doctors (1996-Scribner)
Hernando de Soto: A Savage Quest in the Americas (1996-Random House)
From Cape to Cairo: An African Odyssey (1989-Grove), about a journalist's stint in Africa and riding a bike from Cape Town to Cairo
Pedaling the Ends of the Earth (1985-Simon & Schuster), about bicycling around the world

Sources
AAAS Science Journalism Awards - 2003 Recipients - David Ewing Duncan in aaas.org

References

External links
David Ewing Duncan Website
Columns for The Atlantic
The Experimental Man Project Website
The Personalized Health Project
Biotech Nation
MIT Technology Review (blogs, columns, articles)
Fortune (columns and articles)
Portfolio.com column "Natural Selection"
The Grotto

1958 births
Living people
American male journalists
Vassar College alumni